The Eternal Lover is a fantasy-adventure novel by American writer Edgar Rice Burroughs.  The story was begun in November 1913 under the working title Nu of the Niocene. It was first run serially in two parts by All-Story Weekly.  The first part, released March 7, 1914 was titled "The Eternal Lover" and the second part, released in four installments from January 23, 1915 to February 13, 1915 was titled "Sweetheart Primeval".  The book version was first published by A. C. McClurg on October 3, 1925.  In 1963, Ace Paperback published a version under the title The Eternal Savage.   An E-Text edition has been published by Edgar Rice Burroughs, Inc. and is available online.

Plot summary
A cliff-dwelling warrior of 100,000 years ago, Nu, is magically transported to the present, falls in love with Victoria Custer of Beatrice, Nebraska, the reincarnation of his lost lover Nat-ul, and the two are transported back to the Stone Age. The story is set in Africa, and the present-day sequences include Victoria's brother Barney Custer, protagonist of Burroughs's Ruritanian novel The Mad King, as well as Burroughs's iconic hero Tarzan from his Tarzan novels.

Publication
While the four Custer sibling novellas were first published in an alternating fashion; chronologically-speaking, the events of the two halves of The Eternal Lover/Savage occur between the two halves of The Mad King

Publication order:
 "The Eternal Lover" (The Eternal Lover Part 1) All-Story Weekly, March 7, 1914
 "The Mad King" (The Mad King Part 1) All-Story Weekly March 21, 1914
 "Sweetheart Primeval" (The Eternal Lover Part 2) All-Story Weekly, Jan.–Feb. 1915
 "Barney Custer of Beatrice" (The Mad King Part 2) All-Story Weekly, August 1915

Copyright
All four novellas—as they were serialized in All-Story Weekly—are in the public domain in the United States.

References

External links
 Edgar Rice Burroughs Summary Project page 

American fantasy novels
1925 American novels
1925 fantasy novels
Novels by Edgar Rice Burroughs
Novels set in prehistory
Novels set in precolonial Africa
Novels first published in serial form
Works originally published in Argosy (magazine)
A. C. McClurg books
Novels about time travel